On 29 July 2017, a bombing took place in Panjgur District, Balochistan, Pakistan near Iran–Pakistan border. Four people were killed while five others were injured. Security forces rushed to the site of attack. The nature of the explosion is still unclear. No group have claimed responsibility of the attack. It is reported that Iranian border guards started firing after bombing which delayed rescue services. CM Punjab condemned the attack.

See also 
Terrorist incidents in Pakistan in 2017

References

2017 murders in Pakistan
21st-century mass murder in Pakistan
2017 road incidents
July 2017 crimes in Asia
Mass murder in 2017
Terrorist incidents in Pakistan in 2017
Iran–Pakistan border